French Djibouti may refer to either one of:

 The French Somaliland (1883–1967), also known as the "French Coast of the Somalis"
 The French Territory of the Afars and the Issas (1967–1977)